Litobrenthia tetartodipla is a moth in the family Choreutidae. It was described by Alexey Diakonoff in 1978. It is found in Zhejiang, China.

References

Natural History Museum Lepidoptera generic names catalog

Choreutidae
Moths described in 1978